Red Lake (translated from the Ojibwe language Miskwaagamiiwi-zaaga'igan: Lake with its liquid [water] be colored red) is a lake in Beltrami County in northern Minnesota.

It is the largest natural freshwater lake located entirely within Minnesota, and the 16th largest lake in the United States. The lake is separated into two sections by a peninsula on the eastern side that almost bisects it in the middle.  The community of Ponemah lies on the peninsula.  The two parts of the lake are known as Upper Red Lake and Lower Red Lake. Lower Red Lake lies entirely within the Red Lake Indian Reservation.  Total size is 444 square miles, with a maximum depth of 35 feet.  The elevation of the lake is maintained by a dam at the outflow that is the beginning of Red Lake River, this being at the middle, western edge of Lower Red Lake.

That lake is a popular destination for ice fishing. In the early 2022 fishing season an incident occurred, involving around 200 people laying on the ice sheet on Upper Red Lake. The ice sheet ruptured isolating them over a floating ice bank which separated over a 90ft from contiguous ice. They had to be rescued.

Ecology 
Species of fish present in Red Lake include bigmouth buffalo, black bullhead, black crappie, bluegill, brown bullhead, burbot, freshwater drum, golden redhorse, goldeye, lake trout, lake whitefish, lake sturgeon, largemouth bass, muskie, northern pike, quillback, rock bass, shorthead redhorse, walleye, white sucker, and yellow perch.

References

Red Lake: Blocks 1984 and 1996 thru 1998, Census Tract 9505; Blocks 1998 and 2996 thru 2999, Census Tract 9508; Beltrami County, Minnesota United States Census Bureau\
https://www.dnr.state.mn.us/lakefind/showreport.html?downum=04003501

Lakes of Beltrami County, Minnesota
Lakes of Minnesota